Titus Andronicus is the main character and tragic hero in William Shakespeare's tragedy of the same name, Titus Andronicus. Titus is a Roman nobleman and a general in the war who distinguished himself in ten years of service against the Goths. Despite his exemplary service the war's toll on him is sufficient that he declined the emperorship. Nonetheless, he begins the play as an exemplary citizen. However, faith in the traditions of the Roman system of government eventually leads to his death, as others seek revenge.

Comparisons
Some sources claim that the name Andronicus comes from Andronikos I Komnenos, a 12th-century Byzantine emperor, who shared Titus' proclivity for shooting arrows with messages attached. When Anthony Hopkins played a stylized version of the character in the 1999 film Titus, he described the character as a combination of King Lear, Barney and Hannibal Lecter. Although Titus Andronicus is the main character, some productions have adapted the play to be seen through Young Lucius.

Role in play

The play begins with Titus returning home after many years at war with the Goths, bringing with him the remaining four of his twenty-five sons. Titus is selected by the people of Rome to be the new emperor but refuses this offer due to his already advanced age. In his stead he chooses the former emperor's eldest son Saturninus. By the ceremonial sacrifice of his most noble captive, Alarbus – the eldest son of Tamora, Queen of the Goths – Titus unknowingly sparks off a series of events that are motivated by the desire for revenge. Throughout the play Titus seeks revenge on Tamora for injustices against his family while simultaneously being the target of Tamora's own quest for revenge. Titus murders five people during the play, including one of his sons and his daughter. Displaying strict adherence to Roman law he murders his son, Mutius, for defying the order he has given for his daughter Lavinia to marry the new emperor Saturninus. The second act of filicide occurs at the end of the play when Titus murders Lavinia so that she will not have to live with the shame of having been raped and mutilated on Tamora's orders by her sons Chiron and Demetrius. In Titus' final act of revenge upon Tamora he kills Chiron and Demetrius and uses their blood and bones as the ingredients of a pie. "Let me go grind their bones to powder small, / And with this hateful liquor temper it, / And in that paste let their vile heads be baked" (5.3.197–199). Titus serves this pie to Tamora before killing her. As is customary in a Shakespearean tragedy and as a Senecan hero, Titus Andronicus also dies in the end, killed by Saturninus who is then in turn killed by Titus' last remaining son, Lucius, bringing to an end the cycle of revenge that has prolonged the play.

References

External links
Titus Andronicus full text at MIT

Male Shakespearean characters
 
Andronicus, Titus
Andronicus, Titus
Andronicus, Titus
Andronicus, Titus
Fictional filicides